de la Serna is a surname. Notable people with the name include:

 Jacobo de la Serna (born 1965), American ceramic artist, Spanish Colonial scholar, and painter
 Jorge Juan Crespo de la Serna (1887–1978), Mexican artist, art critic and art historian
 José de la Serna e Hinojosa (1770–1832), Spanish general and Viceroy of Peru
 Juan Pérez de la Serna (1570–1631), seventh Archbishop of Mexico
 Pedro Gómez de la Serna (1806–1871), Spanish jurist and politician
 Ramón Gómez de la Serna (1888–1963), Spanish writer
 Rodrigo de la Serna (born 1976), Argentine actor

See also
 Serna
 Sernas
 La Serna (disambiguation)